Happy Feet Two is a 2011 computer-animated jukebox musical comedy film directed, produced and co-written by George Miller. It is the sequel to the 2006 film Happy Feet,  it stars Ava Acres, Elijah Wood, Robin Williams (in his final animated feature), P!nk, Meibh Campbell, Lil' P-Nut, Common, Magda Szubanski, Hugo Weaving, Brad Pitt, Matt Damon, Sofia Vergara, Richard Carter, and Hank Azaria. In the film, Erik (Ava Acres), the son of Mumble (Wood) and Gloria (P!nk) who is reluctant to dance, runs away from home and encounters the Mighty Sven (Azaria), a tufted puffin that can fly. But when the penguins are trapped by a giant wall of ice and snow, they must stop the apocalypse of Antarctica and get a chance to see the true colors.

An international co-production between the United States and Australia, Kennedy Miller Mitchell and Dr. D Studios from Sydney, Australia, produced the film, which premiered in North American theaters on November 18, 2011, and in Australia on December 26, 2011 in Digital 3D, RealD 3D and IMAX 3D formats. The film was released with an attached 3D Looney Tunes short entitled I Tawt I Taw a Puddy Tat, based on the 1950 children's song of the same name, starring Sylvester and Tweety, with archival recordings by the legendary Mel Blanc. Another Looney Tunes short, Daffy's Rhapsody, starring Daffy Duck and Elmer Fudd, was supposed to premiere with the film, but was switched in production. That short instead premiered with Journey 2: The Mysterious Island in 2012. The film received mixed reviews with critics praising its animation, music and voice acting, while criticizing  its narrative, and grossed just $150 million against its $135 million budget (not including marketing costs), becoming a box office bomb, which resulted in the closure of Miller's Dr. D Studios, making this their only animated film.

Plot

 
a Year after the events of the first film 
Erik, son of Mumble and Gloria, cannot dance like the other Emperor-Land penguins. He and his best friends, Bodicea "Bo" and Atticus, follow one of Mumble's friends, Ramón, leader of the Amigos, to Adélie-Land, which is now being ruled by flying penguin con artist Sven. After surviving the loss of his native fishing grounds due to his "miraculous" flying ability, he partnered with another of Mumble's friends, Lovelace (who was fired from his job as "Guru"). They tell the others they were saved by humans but fled to Antarctica after believing they'd be eaten. There Sven performs his first miracles by revealing moss to the locals and using his power of "Sven Think" to help Ramón find his prospective mate Carmen, who is uninterested. Mumble finds the kids and tells them to return to Emperor-Land, with encouragement from Sven.

Meanwhile, Will, an adventurous and existentialist krill, is determined to discover what lies beyond the swarm. His best friend, Bill, reluctantly follows to ensure his safety. Once separated from the swarm they realize that they're at the bottom of the food chain. Will attempts to "move up the food chain" by eating another creature while Bill believes he's going crazy. Mumble tells Erik he's unique and that he'll someday find his calling, but Erik is still enthralled with Sven. While trying to cross a perilous ice bridge, an elephant seal, Bryan the Beach Master and his two sons, refuse to let the penguins pass. An argument results in Bryan falling off the bridge and getting trapped below. Mumble lures a leopard seal to chase him into the ice, freeing Bryan and earning his respect. Erik, however attributes the successful rescue to his attempt at using "Sven Think", dismaying Mumble.

When the penguins return to Emperor-Land, they discover a large iceberg has trapped the emperor penguins in a deep pit surrounded by ice walls. While Mumble, Erik, and Atticus deliver their meager supply of fish to the stranded penguins, Bo returns to Adélie-Land for more help. When Erik tries to deliver fish by flying like Sven, he nearly tosses himself over the iceberg. Mumble saves him and says penguins cannot fly, hinting that their friends and family are doomed. Erik begins to panic until Gloria sends Mumble away to fish and sings to calm her son down. Meanwhile, Bill creates another swarm after spying a family of jellyfish, but Will adheres to his new predator lifestyle. The next morning, a large flock of skua attack the trapped emperor penguins. Noah the Elder encourages them to fight the birds. When all seems lost, Bo returns with Adélie-Land, led by Sven. Sven orchestrates a cooperative effort to feed the trapped emperors through hunting and bringing back flows of fish from the sea. Still trying to be a predator, Will attacks a fish, that is later scooped up and carried by Sven into Emperor-Land.

The humans who saved Sven and Lovelace come to Antarctica again to help the penguins, but a blizzard causes them to flee. Erik urges Sven to teach the penguins how to fly, but Sven reveals he's not really a penguin, but a tufted puffin. Mumble, after watching snow fall into a crevice between chunks of iceberg, begins to tap-dance and leads the penguins in a dance, weakening the ice. The plan works until several chunks break loose, sending Bo, Atticus, and several penguins into the doomed crevice. Erik and Lovelace tumble towards the edge, and Mumble grabs the threads from Lovelace's vest. The threads snaps and causes Lovelace and Sven to tumble, but Erik is pulled to safety. Having injured his foot, Mumble can't lead the Adélies. Ramón realizes Carmen is trapped below and jumps down to be with her, finally winning her love. Sven proves himself a worthy dancer and despite public outcry he leads the remaining Adélies in dance while Erik and Mumble head to the elephant seal beach to seek Bryan, to help in collapsing the ice. Meanwhile, a newly reformed Will reunites with Bill and their swarm. Bill reveals they are now legends after sharing their journey with the swarm.

Mumble and Erik arrive at Elephant Seal Beach where Bryan is in the middle of a dominance fight. Mumble pleads for help freeing the emperor penguins but Bryan declines because of his Beach Master duties. Using his singing abilities, Erik praises Mumble for his bravery and lectures Bryan for refusing to help after Mumble rescued him. The elephant seals travel en-masse to Emperor-Land. Mumble, Gloria, Erik, the other emperor penguins, the elephant seals, Will, Bill, their krill swarm, Ramón, the Amigos, Carmen, Lovelace and the newly-reformed Sven work together to destroy the iceberg by slamming it to the beat of Queen's "Under Pressure". Finally, the iceberg crumbles, creating an uphill passage and the penguins are saved, and Mumble and Erik reunite with Gloria.

Cast

 Ava Acres as Erik, only son of Gloria and Mumble and Memphis and Norma Jean's grandson. (singing by E. G. Daily; Daily played Baby Mumble in the original film)
 Elijah Wood as Mumble, husband of Gloria and father of Erik.
 Robin Williams as Ramón and Lovelace, Mumble's two friends. Ramón is a laid-back and comical Adélie penguin who speaks in a thick Spanish-accent and Lovelace is a spiritual rockhopper penguin and Sven's partner. He is also this film's narrator, like the first film. This was Williams' last animated feature before his death in 2014.
 Alecia Moore (P!nk) as Gloria, wife of Mumble and mother of Erik (replacing Brittany Murphy, who had died in 2009)
 Meibh Campbell as Bodicea "Bo", daughter of Miss Viola, and Erik's best friend. (singing by E. G. Daily)
 Benjamin "Lil' P-Nut" Flores Jr. as Atticus, son of Seymour, and Erik's best friend.
 Common as Seymour, Atticus's father. (replacing Fat Joe)
 Magda Szubanski as Miss Viola, Bo's mother.
 Hugo Weaving as Noah the Elder, the mayor of Emperor-Land and the leader of its council of elders.
 Brad Pitt as Will the Krill
 Matt Damon as Bill the Krill
 Sofia Vergara as Carmen, Ramón's love interest.
 Richard Carter as Bryan the Beach Master 
 Anthony LaPaglia as Alpha Skua
 Hank Azaria as The Mighty Sven, a tufted puffin who speaks in a Scandinavian accent and is a small-time con artist. He is also the ruler of Adélie lands.
 Jai Sloper and Oscar Beard as Weaner Pups
 Danny Mann as Brokebeak
 Carlos Alazraqui, Johnny A. Sanchez, Lombardo Boyar and Jeffrey Garcia as Nestor, Raul, Lombardo, and Rinaldo, Ramon's Adélie penguin group called "The Amigos" who speak in thick Spanish-accents.
 Lee Perry as Francesco, Wayne the Challenger, Eggbert and Leopard seal
 Roger Narayan as an Indian penguin
Live action cast featured Septimus Caton as the guitarist and Ivan Vunich as the beanie man.

Production

Elijah Wood, Robin Williams, Magda Szubanski and Hugo Weaving reprised their previous performances as Mumble, Ramón, Lovelace, Ms. Viola and Noah. Nicole Kidman and Hugh Jackman make a brief cameo as Norma Jean and Memphis. Also returning for the film are Carlos Alazraqui, Johnny A. Sanchez, Lombardo Boyar and Jeffrey Garcia as Nestor, Lombardo, Raul, and Rinaldo. No other actors repeated their earlier performances. Fat Joe was replaced by Common as Seymour.

Brittany Murphy, who originally voiced Mumble's love interest Gloria, was set to reprise her role and scheduled to begin recording some time in 2010, but died from pneumonia on December 20, 2009. Steve Irwin, who voiced Trev the elephant seal and an albatross, died of a stingray injury on September 4, 2006. P!nk replaced Murphy's role (P!nk had already contributed a song "Tell Me Something Good" to the soundtrack of the first film). Brad Pitt and Matt Damon voiced the tiny krill, Will and Bill. Hank Azaria also signed on to voice The Mighty Sven. E.G. Daily, who played young Mumble in the previous film, played the vocals for Mumble's choreophobic son Erik and the daughter of Miss Viola, Boadicea, as well as additional voices. Sofía Vergara appears in the film as a new character, Carmen. There is a live action scene in the movie as in the first Happy Feet. Mitchell Hicks signed up as the movie's choreographer.

Release

Home media
The DVD, Blu-ray, and 3D Blu-ray release of Happy Feet Two were released on March 13, 2012 from Warner Home Video.

Reception

Box office
The film grossed $64 million in the United States along with $86 million in other territories, for a worldwide total of $150.4 million. Produced on a budget of $135 million, the film ended up losing the studio around $40 million.

On its opening weekend, Happy Feet Two earned $21,237,068 while playing on 3,606 screens. This was barely half of the $41,533,432 that the first Happy Feet made on its opening weekend in November 2006. Approximately 50% of Happy Feet Twos box-office take came from the 2,825 screens that showed it in 3D. Thus, when adjusted for ticket price inflation, Happy Feet Two achieved less than 45% of the attendance figures of its predecessor. Major box-office prediction websites were almost unanimously predicting an opening weekend of $35 million - $45 million, so Happy Feet Twos box-office performance has thus far been underwhelming. Among 2011's animated films, Happy Feet Twos opening weekend ranks 8th. Kurt Orzeck of the Vancouver Sun has reported that "due to the poor performance of Happy Feet Two, 600 of the 700 employees at the Sydney-based Dr. D. Studios, the digital production studio behind the animated movie, have reportedly received their walking papers."

Critical response
 On Metacritic, the film has a score of 50 out of 100 based on reviews from 35 critics, indicating "mixed or average reviews". Audiences polled by CinemaScore gave the film an average grade of "B+" on an A+ to F scale.

Richard Corliss of Time gave the film a positive review and said that Miller is "not content to duplicate the pleasures of his first penguin film; he dares to go bigger, deeper, higher — happier." Roger Ebert of the Chicago Sun-Times gave the film two-and-a-half stars (out of four) stating that "The animation is bright and attractive, the music gives the characters something to do, but the movie has too much dialogue in the areas of philosophy and analysis." British newspaper The Telegraph named Happy Feet Two one of the ten worst films of 2011, saying "Happy Feet Two is an appalling 3D animated sequel about a colony of all‑singin', all-dancin', all-infuriatin' penguins."

Accolades

Video game
Happy Feet Two: The Video Game, released November 8, 2011, was developed by KMM Games for PlayStation 3, Xbox 360, and Wii. WayForward Technologies developed the Nintendo 3DS and Nintendo DS versions., published by Warner Bros.

Soundtrack

The soundtrack album for the film was released by WaterTower Music on CD on November 21, 2011 and on iTunes on November 15, 2011. Unlike the previous film's two album releases—one for its songs and one for its score—both the songs and John Powell's score are included on this album. The songs "Happy Feet Two Opening Medley," "Bridge of Light," and "Under Pressure/Rhythm Nation" are led by P!nk, who lends her vocals to the character Gloria, taking the place of Brittany Murphy from the first film.

The deluxe edition of the album contains an addition of 5 songs performed by Ozomatli; these songs and more can also be found on the soundtrack for the video game, which was released on iTunes on November 8, 2011.

Charts

References

External links

 
 
 
 

2011 films
2010s American animated films
2010s Australian animated films
2010s buddy films
2010s musical comedy films
2011 3D films
2011 animated films
2011 computer-animated films
American 3D films
American buddy comedy films
Australian buddy films
American children's animated comedy films
American children's animated musical films
American computer-animated films
American musical comedy films
American sequel films
Animated buddy films
Animated films about animals
Animated films about penguins
Australian 3D films
Australian animated feature films
Australian children's animated films
Australian children's musical films
Films with live action and animation
IMAX films
Jukebox musical films
Warner Bros. films
Warner Bros. animated films
Village Roadshow Pictures animated films
Films set in Antarctica
Films about animals
Films directed by George Miller
Films produced by George Miller
Films produced by Bill Miller
Films produced by Doug Mitchell
Films scored by John Powell
Films using motion capture
2010s children's films
3D animated films
Films with screenplays by George Miller
2011 comedy films
2010s English-language films